Tabor Academy is a Secondary school with Academy status located in Braintree, Essex, England.

Its Executive Headteacher is Mrs Anita Johnson, the CEO of the Loxford School Trust and the Headteacher of Loxford School, and Tabor's Headteacher is Mrs Sarah Speller, who took over from Elizabeth Robinson in 2018.

History

The school started life in the early part of the twentieth century on Panfield Lane. Nominally co-educational, girls and boys were separated; the school effectively was split into two parts. Later with the introduction of the 1944 Education Act the school opened as a newly established secondary modern school and eventually became a fully coeducational school. It was eventually renamed the Margaret Tabor Secondary Modern School. The Tabor part of the name derived from the then local and prominent Tabor family who were major woollen merchants in the 16th century. The family shield was used as the badge of the school, and can still be seen clearly today decorating Bocking bridge near the Old Convent, and on many old buildings in Braintree and Bocking. In September 1971 with the introduction of comprehensive education, the school was merged with the local grammar school to form The Tabor High School.

The school replaced the Tabor High School as the secondary school for west Braintree and surrounding villages and the old Senior section site was knocked down in 2004. Steven Clark, its former headteacher, was one of the youngest Headteachers in the United Kingdom.

In 2007 it had science speciality status and was branded as Tabor Science College.

The school converted to Academy status in January 2013. It first joined the Lilac Sky Trust. It refactored the Loxford School Trust based in Ilford. As of 2015, Tabor Academy is also a partner in the Braintree Sixth Form which opened on the Notley High School site in September 2009.

Description
This is a smaller than average secondary school with fewer than 1000 students. It had legacy issues with low level disruption that has depressed the results but the trust have addressed these and in the 2016 Ofsted Inspection it was rated as a 'Good School'.

Buildings
The new school building was first built around 1992, sharing facilities with Braintree Leisure Centre. Since its opening, it has been added to in stages. The original site contains 30 classrooms and was intended to be the new building for the Senior section of the Tabor Science College located a short walk away. 

The second stage was completed when the Senior and Middle schools merged and contains a similar number of classrooms. The Third stage (a new building built for the languages faculty was completed in the summer of 2006, adding an extra 5 classrooms and a new faculty office and locker space.

Academics
Virtually all maintained schools and academies follow the National Curriculum, and are inspected by Ofsted on how well they succeed in delivering a 'broad and balanced curriculum'. Schools endeavour to get all students to achieve the English Baccalaureate(EBACC) qualification- this must include core subjects a modern or ancient foreign language, and either History or Geography.

The school operates a three-year, Key Stage 3 where all the core National Curriculum subjects are taught. Year 7 and Year 8 study core subjects: English, Mathematics, Science. The following foundation subjects are offered: Art, Technology, Computing, Drama,  RE, French, German,(formerly Spanish), Geography and History, Music and PE.

In 10 and 11, that is in Key Stage 4They choose the language students study a core of English Language, English Literature, Mathematics, Science: Double or Triple, PSCHE, RE and Physical Education.  
Pupils select 1 Language (French, German ),  1 Humanity (Geography or History).
Students have two options chosen from a pool of Art, Business Studies, Food Preparation and Nutrition, Computer Studies, Dance, Design and Technology, Drama, Geography, History, Media Studies,  Music, Photography, Physical Education, Sociology, Triple Science (Biology, Chemistry and Physics).

Pastoral
Historically the school developed a reward scheme and mentoring system,  developed by Steven Clark, its former Headteacher. 
The school was first originally split into houses, Brunel, Turner, Austen and Redgrave. Since 2019, these have become Hawking, Farah, Pankhurst and Parks. The School's teacher/student mentoring program for year 11 helps those under-achieving across the year groups.

References

External links
 Loxford School Trust official website
 BBC NEWS league tables for Tabor Science College

Secondary schools in Essex
Academies in Essex
Braintree, Essex
Educational institutions established in 1944
1944 establishments in England